Adam Mackinnon (born 30 April 2003) is a Scottish professional footballer who plays as a midfielder for Montrose, on loan from Ross County.

Career

Ross County
Mackinnon made his he made his debut for County on 14 November 2020 in the Scottish League Cup against Stirling Albion. After returning from a loan spell with Brora Mackinnon made his league debut for County on 26 February 2022 in a 3–1 win against St Johnstone coming on for Harry Paton in the 90th minute.

Brora Rangers (loan)
On 20 November 2020 Mackinnon joined Highland Football League side Brora Rangers ahead of the new season. Mackinnon rejoined Brora on 30 August 2021 on a six-month loan from County.

Loans to Montrose
Mackinnon was loaned to Scottish League One club Montrose in the summer of 2022. He was recalled from loan on 27 December 2022 to be assessed by County manager Malky Mackay. On 27 January 2023, Mackinnon would return on loan for the Gable Endies until the end of the season.

Career statistics

References

External links
 

2003 births
Living people
People from Stornoway
Scottish footballers
Ross County F.C. players
Brora Rangers F.C. players
Highland Football League players
Scottish Professional Football League players
Sportspeople from Scottish islands
Montrose F.C. players